is a Japanese manga artist.

Career 
Okano was born in Ibaraki Prefecture. She attended a graphic design school after graduating from high school and has never worked as a manga assistant. Her first published work as a professional manga artist was Esther, Please in 1982 in the shōjo manga magazine Petit Flower. In the same magazine, in 1984, she started publishing the series Fancy Dance about a Buddhist monk who is trained in becoming the new head of the temple. In 1989, she won the Shogakukan Manga Award in the shōjo category for Fancy Dance. The same year, the series was adapted into a live-action film directed by Masayuki Suo.

In the 1990s, she published manga in magazines like Big Comic Spirits, Comic Tom and Comic Burger. For the series Onmyōji, based on an original work by Baku Yumemakura, she received the Tezuka Osamu Cultural Prize in 2001 and the Seiun Award in 2006. It is considered her most famous work. She went on to produce a sequel version, Onmyōji: Tamatebako, which was serialized from 2011 until 2017 in the comic magazine Melody.

Style 
Okano publishes manga in magazines across different gendered categories, including shōjo manga, josei manga and seinen manga. Tomoko Yamada assesses that her style is influenced by sentiments of women's media: "One can see this in the graceful beauty of the conduct of Okano’s characters, the picturesque and polished structure of every frame, and the emphasis on subtlety in story development."

Her drawing style is influenced by illustrator Motoichiro Takebe. Since Onmyōji, she uses brush and ink in reference to Japanese painting.

Personal life 
She is married to director Makoto Tezuka, the son of famous manga artist Osamu Tezuka.

Works
, 1984-1990
Ryogoku Oshare Rikishi (両国花錦闘士), 1989-1990
Calling (コーリング), 1991-1993
, 1993-2005
, 1995-2007
Inanna (イナンナ), 2007-2010
Onmyōji: Tamatebako (陰陽師 玉手匣), 2011-2017

References 

1960 births
Living people
Women manga artists
Manga artists from Ibaraki Prefecture
Japanese female comics artists
Female comics writers
Japanese women writers